Mischief Theatre is a British theatre company founded in 2008 by a group of students from the London Academy of Music and Dramatic Art in West London, and directed by Henry Lewis, Jonathan Sayer, and Henry Shields. The group originally began by doing improvised comedy shows, but by 2012 they expanded into comedic theatrical performances that includes choreographed routines, jokes, and stunts.

The company is best known for their performances as the fictional theatre company, The Cornley Polytechnic Drama Society, who attempt several amateur performances that comedically go wrong. Significant work by the company includes the award-winning 2012 stage play The Play That Goes Wrong and the BBC television series The Goes Wrong Show. Several of the stage performances by the company have been shown in the West End of London, and also in theatres across the United Kingdom, North America, and Europe.

History
Mischief Theatre was first formed in 2008 by Henry Lewis, Jonathan Sayer, and Henry Shields, while studying in a drama foundation course at the London Academy of Music and Dramatic Art. The three founders selected the company's members, most having been recruited from those attending the same course, including Dave Hearn, Nancy Zamit, Bryony Corrigan, and Niall Ransome. The company conducted its first performance, Let's See What Happens, at The Questors Studio Theatre in July 2008, which they later performed at The Edinburgh Festival the following month.  

In 2012, Lewis, Sayer and Shields devised the script for The Play That Goes Wrong, originally titled The Murder Before Christmas, a comedic play based on the real-life situations regarding accidents and problems that can occur in stage productions. The script saw the company's members diverge into choreographed performances, including stunts and jokes. The play premiered in London later that year, and after a successful run went on to multiple UK tours and was featured at the 2015 Royal Variety Performance show. The directors soon focused the company to conducting additional new shows, either based on improvisational comedy or scripted performances, including Lights! Camera! Improvise!, Late Night Impro Fight, and Mischief Movie Night. 

In 2016, the company was approached by the BBC to conduct a televised Christmas special, consisting of an adaptation of their play Peter Pan Goes Wrong. The adaptation proved a success, with the BBC later commissioning the company to develop a new Christmas special in 2017, before offering its members their own television series, The Goes Wrong Show, in 2019.

On 1 April 2020, Mischief Theatre began a weekly podcast titled "Mischief Makers", which focused on the members of the Mischief Theatre. During the COVID-19 pandemic, Mischief Theatre put on improvisational comedy shows (Mischief Movie Night) in open-air venues in late August and early September. They briefly took the show to the Vaudeville Theatre in December before a national lockdown caused venues to close, forcing their planned schedule to be cut short. To compensate for this, the company conducted their show online, under the title Mischief Movie Night In.

Stage productions

The Play That Goes Wrong

The Play That Goes Wrong is a play by Henry Lewis, Jonathan Sayer, and Henry Shields. It premiered at the Old Red Lion Theatre in London in 2012, moved to Trafalgar Studios in 2013, toured the UK and internationally in 2014 and opened to the Duchess Theatre in the West End on 14 September 2014. In the play The Cornley Polytechnic Drama Society attempt to put on a 1920s murder mystery, but the performance is beset with disasters and the accident prone cast struggle through every scene.

It won Best New Comedy at the 2015 Laurence Olivier Awards and Best New Comedy at the WhatsOnStage.com Awards in 2014

Its run in London's West End at the Duchess Theatre has been extended multiple times, and is still currently running.

The play opened on Broadway in New York City at the Lyceum Theatre in April 2017 with the original West End company. It closed on Broadway in January 2019, before immediately moving to the Off-Broadway theatre New World Stages and reopening in February 2019, where it still continues to run. The Broadway company was followed by 2 North American touring companies and a sit-down production at Chicago's Broadway Playhouse. From July 2023 to August 2023, a short sit down production will take place at Washington D.C.’s Kennedy Center. 

Foreign language productions of The Play that Goes Wrong have also been presented in France, Israel, Finland, Italy, Belgium and Russia.

Productions were due to open in China,  Australia, Finland, Hungary, Poland, Spain, Greece, Israel, Scandinavia, Brazil, Germany, Belgium, the Netherlands, Argentina, Uruguay, Turkey, New Zealand, Singapore, Philippines and South Africa.

Peter Pan Goes Wrong

Peter Pan Goes Wrong is a comedy play by Henry Lewis, Jonathan Sayer, and Henry Shields in the 'Goes Wrong' range. It premiered at the Pleasance Theatre in London in December 2013 before touring the UK in 2014 and 2015, and in December 2015 it opened at London's Apollo Theatre. Following widespread critical acclaim, Peter Pan Goes Wrong returned to the Apollo Theatre for a limited run from 21 October 2016 – 29 January 2017.

The play is adapted from the original stage play Peter Pan by J.M. Barrie and in it the inept and accident prone Cornley Polytechnic Drama Society set out to present the classic tale of Peter Pan with comical and disastrous results.

The production was nominated for two Off West End Awards in 2013 for Best Production and Best Ensemble.

Peter Pan Goes Wrong will make its Broadway debut at the Barrymore Theater on 17 March 2023 (with an opening date scheduled for 19 April 2023) featuring a majority of the original company, a number of US Mischief alumni, and includes the addition of a new character.

The Comedy About a Bank Robbery
The Comedy About a Bank Robbery is a comedy play, written by Lewis, Sayer and Shields. The play opened at the West End's Criterion Theatre on 31 March 2016, with an official opening night on 21 April 2016. The production closed on 15 March 2020 due to the COVID-19 pandemic.

Original cast included: Henry Lewis, Henry Shields, Jonathan Sayer, Nancy Zamit, Dave Hearn, Charlie Russell, Greg Tannahill, Jeremy Lloyd and Chris Leask

The play is directed by Mark Bell, with set design by David Farley and costume design by Roberto Surace.

Lights! Camera! Improvise! and Mischief Movie Night
Lights! Camera! Improvise! is an improvised comedy show format devised and performed by Mischief Theatre. The show was first presented at The Edinburgh Festival in August 2009 and has since been performed across the UK and internationally as well as at The Duchess Theatre in the West End.

In the show a film collector named Oscar invites the audience to suggest genres, locations and a title for a film which he then finds in his extensive DVD collection. A company of six or seven performers then improvise a longform narrative based on these ideas under the direction of Oscar.

In 2013 the production won a Spirit of the Fringe Award at Edinburgh Fringe Festival. 

In 2017 the show, renamed Mischief Movie Night, began a limited run at The Arts Theatre in London's West End.

In 2020 Mischief Theatre began live-streaming semi-regular performances of Mischief Movie Night In during the COVID-19 pandemic.

Vaudeville Theatre residency
In September 2019, Mischief Theatre began a yearlong residency at the Vaudeville Theatre in London's West End, alongside the long-running productions of The Play That Goes Wrong and The Comedy About a Bank Robbery.

Groan Ups
Groan Ups was written by Henry Lewis, Jonathan Sayer and Henry Shields, and was the first production of the residency, running from 20 September until 1 December 2019, featuring the original Mischief company and directed by Kirsty Patrick Ward.

Magic Goes Wrong

Magic Goes Wrong is a collaboration between the company and Penn & Teller that combines the Goes Wrong formula with actual stage magic. The production began previews 14 December 2019, prior officially opening on 8 January 2020. It had been extended to run until August 2020, but the COVID-19 pandemic shut it down in March. The production reopens on 21 October 2021 at The Apollo Theatre for a strictly limited Christmas run.

Additional Shows
Mischief Theatre returned to the Edinburgh Fringe Festival in August 2022. In addition to Mischief Movie Night, Mischief also presented Mind Mangler: Member of the Tragic Circle (which is based off of a character in Magic Goes Wrong) and Charlie Russell Aims to Please, a solo show written and starring original company member Charlie Russell. Outside of the official Mischief productions, company members participated in Starship Improvise at the Festival, partnering up with fellow improv-comedy group Showstoppers, including Ruth Bratt. Bratt had appeared in three series of the BAFTA award winning BBC2 series People Just Do Nothing.

Television productions
Peter Pan Goes Wrong was adapted for a one-hour television special which was broadcast on 31 December 2016 on BBC One. It featured almost the entire original cast (with the exception of Rob Falconer) and guest starred David Suchet as the narrator.

On 30 December 2017, A Christmas Carol Goes Wrong aired on BBC One, featuring both Dame Diana Rigg and Sir Derek Jacobi. Following the events of the previous year, the Cornley Polytechnic Drama Society have now been blacklisted by the BBC. Determined to get back on the air, they hijack a live broadcast of Charles Dickens' A Christmas Carol. The special was watched by a reported audience of 4.61 million.

On 22 February 2019, it was announced the company would create a six-part BBC One series titled The Goes Wrong Show, starring the original cast and creatives behind The Play That Goes Wrong.

The Nativity was the subject of the 2020 Christmas special.

Peter Pan Goes Wrong, A Christmas Carol Goes Wrong and The Goes Wrong Show were filmed at dock10 studios.

Awards and nominations

References

External links

 
Theatre companies in London
Comedy theatre
2008 establishments in the United Kingdom